Dmitri Kostromitin (born 22 January 1990) is a Russian professional ice hockey defenceman. He is currently a free agent.

Kostromitin made his Kontinental Hockey League debut playing with Admiral Vladivostok during the 2013–14 season.

Career statistics

Regular season and playoffs

References

External links

1990 births
Living people
Admiral Vladivostok players
HC Lada Togliatti players
Montreal Junior Hockey Club players
Rouyn-Noranda Huskies players
Russian ice hockey defencemen
Sportspeople from Chelyabinsk
Traktor Chelyabinsk players
HC Vityaz players
HC '05 Banská Bystrica players
Herning Blue Fox players
Yermak Angarsk players
MKS Cracovia (ice hockey) players
HC Neman Grodno players
Russian expatriate ice hockey people
Russian expatriate sportspeople in Slovakia
Russian expatriate sportspeople in Canada
Russian expatriate sportspeople in Poland
Russian expatriate sportspeople in Denmark
Russian expatriate sportspeople in Belarus
Russian expatriate sportspeople in Kazakhstan
Expatriate ice hockey players in Slovakia
Expatriate ice hockey players in Canada
Expatriate ice hockey players in Poland
Expatriate ice hockey players in Denmark
Expatriate ice hockey players in Belarus
Expatriate ice hockey players in Kazakhstan